Kunice is a settlement in Valjevo, Serbia. A dam is planned to be built in the village.

Populated places in Kolubara District
Valjevo